Trygg may refer to:

People
Carl Johan Trygg (1887–1954), Scandinavian woodcarver
Carl Olaf Trygg (1910-1993), Scandinavian woodcarver
Lars Trygg, Scandinavian woodcarver
Mats Trygg (born 1976), Norwegian ice hockey player
Marius Trygg (born 1976), Norwegian ice hockey player
Mathias Trygg (born 1986), Norwegian ice hockey player
Nils Trygg (1914–1951), Scandinavian woodcarver

Other uses
Trygg the Sorcerer, a comic book character by DC Comics
Trygg Hansa, a Swedish company acquired by Skandinaviska Enskilda Banken
Trygg class torpedo boat, Royal Norwegian Navy
HNoMS Trygg, Royal Norwegian Navy
SFK Trygg, a Norwegian sports club

See also
 Trigg (disambiguation)
 Triggs (disambiguation)